Ground deicing of aircraft is commonly performed in both commercial and general aviation. The fluids used in this operation are called deicing or anti-icing fluids.  The initials ADF (Aircraft Deicing Fluid), ADAF (Aircraft Deicer and Anti-icer Fluid) or AAF (Aircraft Anti-icing Fluid) are commonly used. Environmental concerns include increased salinity of groundwater where de-icing fluids are discharged into soil, and toxicity to humans and other mammals.

Fluids used

Deicing fluids come in a variety of types, and are typically composed of ethylene glycol (EG) or propylene glycol (PG), along with other ingredients such as thickening agents, surfactants (wetting agents), corrosion inhibitors, colors, and UV-sensitive dye. Propylene glycol-based fluid is more common because it is less toxic than ethylene glycol.

SAE International (formerly known as the Society of Automotive Engineers) publishes standards (SAE AMS 1428 and AMS 1424) for four different types of aviation deicing fluids:
 Type I fluids have a low viscosity, and are considered "unthickened". They provide only short term protection because they quickly flow off surfaces after use. They are typically sprayed on hot (130–180 °F, 55–80 °C) at high pressure to remove snow, ice, and frost. Usually they are dyed orange to aid in identification and application.
 Type II fluids are pseudoplastic, which means they contain a polymeric thickening agent to prevent their immediate flow off aircraft surfaces. Type II prevents snow, ice or frost contamination from adhering to the aircraft from the apron to takeoff. Typically the fluid film will remain in place until the aircraft attains  or so, at which point the viscosity breaks down due to shear stress. The high speeds required for viscosity breakdown means that this type of fluid is useful only for larger aircraft. The use of Type II fluids is diminishing in favour of Type IV. Type II fluids are generally clear in color.
 Type III fluids can be thought of as a compromise between Type I and Type II fluids. They are intended for use on slower aircraft, with a rotation speed of less than 100 knots. Type III fluids are generally bright yellow in color.
 Type IV has the same purpose and meets the same AMS standards as Type II fluids, but they provide a longer holdover time. They are typically dyed green to aid in the application of a consistent layer of fluid.

The International Organization for Standardization publishes equivalent standards (ISO 11075 and ISO 11078), defining the same four types.

Deicing fluids containing thickeners (Types II, III, and IV) are also known as anti-icing fluids, because they are used primarily to prevent icing from re-occurring after an initial deicing with a Type I fluid.

TKS fluid is similar to Type I fluid and is used by in-flight TKS ice protection systems.  It can also be
used for ground-based deicing.  It conforms to different standards than Type I fluid, namely DTD 406B, AL-5, and NATO S-745.

Chemical composition
The main component of deicing fluid is a freezing point depressant (FPD), usually propylene glycol or ethylene glycol.  Other ingredients vary depending on the manufacturer, but the exact composition of a particular brand of fluid is generally held as confidential proprietary information.

Ethylene glycol (EG) fluids are still in use for aircraft deicing in some parts of the world because it has a lower operational use temperature (LOUT) than propylene glycol (PG). However, PG is more common because it is less toxic than ethylene glycol.

In non-aviation contexts, deicing chemicals typically contain chloride salts, such as calcium chloride (CaCl2).  These are prohibited in aircraft deicing fluids due to their corrosive properties.

Based on chemical analysis, the U.S. Environmental Protection Agency has identified five main classes of additives
widely used among manufacturers:
 Benzotriazole and methyl-substituted benzotriazole, used as corrosion inhibitor.
 Alkylphenol and alkylphenol ethoxylates, nonionic surfactants used to reduce surface tension.
 Triethanolamine, used as a pH buffer.
 High molecular weight, nonlinear polymers, used to increase viscoelasticity.
 Dyes used to aid in identification.

TKS fluid (used by TKS in-flight deicing systems) contains 85% ethylene glycol, 5% isopropyl alcohol, and 10% water.

Usage statistics
The amount of fluid necessary to deice an aircraft depends on a wide variety of factors.

The cost of fluid varies widely due to market conditions. The amount deicing service companies charge end users is generally in the range of US$8 to US$12 per diluted gallon (US$2.10 to US$3.20 per liter).

Note that type II and type III fluids are rarely used in the United States.

Measurement of performance
Deicing fluid performance is primarily measured by Holdover Time (HOT), and Lowest Operational Use Temperature (LOUT).

Holdover Time (HOT) is the length of time an aircraft can wait after being treated prior to takeoff. Holdover time is influenced by the fluid dilution, ambient temperature, wind, precipitation, humidity, aircraft skin material, aircraft skin temperature, and other factors. If the Holdover Time is exceeded the aircraft must be re-treated before takeoff.

Lowest Operational Use Temperature (LOUT) is the lowest temperature at which a de/anti-icing fluid will adequately flow off aircraft critical surfaces and maintain the required anti-icing freezing point buffer which is 7 °C (13 °F) below outside air temperature (OAT).

In the United States, the Federal Aviation Administration (FAA) publishes official Holdover Time and Lowest Operational Use Temperature tables for all approved deicing fluids, and revises them annually.

For Type I fluids, the Holdover Time listed in the FAA tables ranges from 1 to 22 minutes, depending on the above-mentioned situational factors. For Type IV fluids the Holdover Time ranges from 9 minutes to 160 minutes.

Dilution
Deicing fluids work best when they are diluted with water. For example, undiluted Dow UCAR Deicing Fluid (Type I ethylene glycol), has a freezing point of −28 °C. Water freezes at 0 °C.  However, a mixture of 70 percent deicing fluid and 30 percent water freezes below −55 °C. This is known as the eutectic concentration, where the freezing point of the mixture is at its lowest point, and lower than either of the component substances.

Depending on the manufacturer, deicing fluids may be sold in concentrated or pre-diluted formulations. Dilution, where necessary, must be done according to ambient weather condition and the manufacturer's instructions in order to minimize costs while maintaining safety.

The dilution of a particular sample of fluid (and hence its freezing point) can be easily confirmed by measuring its refractive index with a refractometer, and looking up the result in the deicing fluid manufacturer's tables.

Layer Thickness

Thickened fluids (types II, III, and IV) are intended to remain on surfaces after application
in order to provide anti-icing protection.  They are also designed to slough off during the takeoff run so that they do
not negatively affect flight performance.  In order to obtain these objectives they must be applied at the correct thickness.

For a typical type IV fluid, a layer thickness of between 1 mm and 3 mm is required, however each 
manufacturer will document their own requirements.

Standards compliance
Manufacturers of aviation deicing fluids must certify that their products conform to the AMS 1424 and 1428 standards using the defined High Speed Ramp Test, Low Speed Ramp Test, and Water Spray Endurance Test.

The objective of these standards is to ensure acceptable aerodynamic characteristics of the deicing/anti-icing fluids as they flow off aircraft lifting and control surfaces during the takeoff ground acceleration and climb.

With the development of non-glycol deicing fluids these standards are evolving to address additional factors such as corrosion, foaming, thickening, residue formation, slipperiness, and mold formation.

Cautions
The repeated application of Type II, Type III or Type IV anti-icing fluid may cause residues to collect in aerodynamic quiet areas, cavities and gaps. These residues may rehydrate and freeze under certain temperature changes, in high humidity and/or rain conditions. In addition, they may block or impede critical flight control systems.

An appropriate inspection and cleaning program should be established when using these types of fluids.

Environmental impacts

Many de-icing fluids, including glycol-based fluids, are toxic to humans and other mammals, and damage the ecosystems where the fluids are discharged, such as the areas around airports. The use of such fluids can cause changes to nearby acquatic habitats that harm fish and other wildlife. 

Ethylene glycol and propylene glycol exert high levels of biochemical oxygen demand (BOD) during degradation in surface waters. Large quantities of dissolved oxygen (DO) in the water column are consumed when microbial populations decompose propylene glycol. This process can adversely affect fish and other aquatic life by consuming oxygen needed for their survival.

Thickened fluids typically use alkylphenol ethoxylate (APE) surfactants, the biodegradation products of which have been shown to be endocrine disruptors, and as such these are banned in Europe and are under EPA scrutiny in the U.S. A number of fluids also use benzotriazole or tolyltriazole corrosion inhibitors, which are toxic and non-biodegradable and thus persist in the environment. Research is ongoing to find less problematic alternatives. This is proving to be challenging due to the many performance and safety factors that need to be considered.

One U.S. FAA-approved deicing fluid (Kilfrost DF Sustain) is 1,3-propanediol, a fermentation product of corn, as a freezing point depressant instead of ethylene glycol or propylene glycol.

Benzotriazole (and tolyltriazoles), although not highly toxic, is not readily degradable and has a limited sorption tendency. Hence, it is only partly removed in wastewater treatment plants and a substantial fraction reaches surface water such as rivers and lakes.

See also 
 Deicing
 Ground deicing of aircraft
 Ice protection system

References

Aviation and the environment
Aviation ground support equipment
Polyols